KVS may stand for:

 Kendriya Vidyalaya Sangathan, a school chain in India
 KVS (France), a former microcar manufacturer

See also

KV-5 tank
KV5 tomb
KV (disambiguation)
KVZ (disambiguation)